Below is a list of the players that have represented the Sydney Roosters at rugby league since 1908.

International Representatives

Australia

England

Great Britain

New Zealand

State of Origin Representatives

New South Wales

Queensland

See also

References

External links

Representatives
National Rugby League lists
Sydney-sport-related lists